Major General John Åge Lundström (8 June 1890 – 26 September 1975) was a Swedish Air Force officer and horse rider who competed in the 1920 and 1924 Summer Olympics.

Early life
Lundström was born on 8 June 1890 in Stockholm, Sweden, the son of Ernst Lundström, an artist, and his wife countess Mathilda (née Rudenschöld).

Career

Military career
Lundström was commissioned as an officer in 1910 and was appointed lieutenant in the Life Regiment Dragoons in 1916. He became an air force pilot in 1925 and was appointed captain in the General Staff in 1924 and captain of the Swedish Air Force in 1926. Lundström was a teacher in air warfare at the Royal Swedish Army Staff College 1926–29 and at the Royal Military Academy 1928–31. He was promoted to major in 1932, lieutenant colonel in 1936, colonel in 1937, and major general in 1945. Lundström left the military in 1947.

He was the adjutant of the Prince Gustaf Adolf, Duke of Västerbotten from 1929. Lundström was acting commanding officer of the 4th Air Corps in 1931–32 and commanding officer of the Swedish Air Force Flying School 1932–43 and commanding officer of the Second Air Group (Andra flygeskadern, E 2) 1943–46. Lundström was the chief of staff and assistant to Count Folke Bernadotte during his mediator works in Palestine in 1948, and was an eyewitness to Bernadotte's assassination.

Sports career

Lundström was a Swedish champion in foil fencing in 1914, and a district champion in foil and épée fencing in 1933 and in foil fencing in 1938. He was adjutant and teacher at the riding school at Strömsholm Palace in 1919–1921.

At the 1920 Summer Olympics he and his horse Yrsa were part of the Swedish equestrian team, which won the gold medal in the team eventing competition. They also won the silver medal in the individual eventing. He competed in the individual jumping event with another horse, Eros I, and finished 14th.

At the 1924 Summer Olympics Lundström and his horse Anvers won the gold medal with the Swedish jumping team. In the individual jumping event they finished 10th. he died in Sweden at age 85

Personal life
Lundström was the owner of the estate Hildesborg outside Landskrona. In 1932 he married Margit von Geijer (born 1907), daughter of rittmeister Wilhelm von Geijer and countess Irma von Hallwyl. He was the father of Signe (born 1934), Irma (born 1936) and Åge (born 1943).

Awards and decorations

Swedish
   King Gustaf V's Jubilee Commemorative Medal (1948)
   Commander 1st Class of the Order of the Sword (6 June 1945)
   Commander 2nd Class of the Order of the Sword (15 November 1941)
   Knight of the Order of the Polar Star (1938)
   Medal for Noble Deeds in gold
  Swedish Military Sports Association's gold medal with wreath (Sveriges militära idrottsförbunds guldmedalj med krans)
  Royal Swedish Aero Club Medal of Merit in gold (Kungliga Svenska Aeroklubbens förtjänstguldmedalj)

Foreign
  Commander of the Saxe-Ernestine House Order (before 1942)
  Commander 2nd Class of the Order of Polonia Restituta (before 1942)
  Order of the German Eagle (before 1942)
  Officer of the Order of the Crown of Italy (before 1942)
  2nd Class of the Military Cross (before 1942)
  Knight 1st Class Knight of the Order of the White Rose of Finland (before 1942)
  Knight of the Legion of Honour (before 1942)

Honours
  Member of the Royal Swedish Academy of War Sciences (1937)

References

External links

 
 

1890 births
1975 deaths
Swedish Air Force major generals
United Nations military personnel
Swedish event riders
Swedish show jumping riders
Olympic equestrians of Sweden
Swedish male equestrians
Equestrians at the 1920 Summer Olympics
Equestrians at the 1924 Summer Olympics
Olympic gold medalists for Sweden
Olympic silver medalists for Sweden
Olympic medalists in equestrian
Military personnel from Stockholm
Commanders First Class of the Order of the Sword
Knights of the Order of the Polar Star
Commanders of the Order of Polonia Restituta
Chevaliers of the Légion d'honneur
Members of the Royal Swedish Academy of War Sciences
Medalists at the 1924 Summer Olympics
Medalists at the 1920 Summer Olympics